ScreenFlow from Telestream, Inc. is a screencasting and video editing software for the macOS operating system. It can capture the audio and video from the computer, edit the captured video, add highlights or annotation, and output a number of different file types such as AIFF, GIF, M4V, MOV, and MP4.

Version 5 added the support of video and audio capturing from a connected iPhone, iPod touch, or iPad.

Version 9 of ScreenFlow was released on November 12, 2019 as a direct purchase from Telestream, Inc and via the Mac App Store.

Major Release Dates

Awards
ScreenFlow won the Editors' Choice Award from Macworld in December 2012.

ScreenFlow won an Eddy Winner award from Macworld in December 2008.

See also
 Comparison of screencasting software

References

Further reading
 'ScreenFlow 5 review: The Mac's best screencasting app gets better with iOS capture' by Christopher Breen (November 28, 2014) — Macworld

External links
 

MacOS multimedia software
Streaming software
Proprietary software